Sigay, officially the Municipality of Sigay, is a 5th class municipality in the province of Ilocos Sur, Philippines. According to the 2020 census, it has a population of 2,552 people.

History
Natives of the town claim that Sigay is as old as any other place in the province founded during the Spanish regime. But written records are yet to be found regarding its history. Oral tradition, however, has it that the name of the town originated from the ilocano term for fish trap, "sigay". The legend goes that, in the older times, Lake Ban-ao in Barangay Mabileg was once the village's most valuable source of fish. Around the area, one of the better-known fish species, the mudfish, apparently - in a fish trap, and brought the fish to the market. A Spaniard came along and asked where she got the fish. thinking that the stranger was asking about the gear she caught the fish with, she answered, "Sigay". It was by this incidence that the town started to be known by that name.

Another version of the etymology situates the legend in a setting when the "sigay" itself had to be re-invented for hunting. In those times, the village was still made up of "tribu" or tribes. As was the custom, each tribu chose a leader who ought to be the strongest, most fearless, and bravest in the clans. one of the leaders, and his hunters, loved to climb the mountains to hunt for food. Because it would then be easier to trap the animals in the forests, than run after them for the kill, the hunters devised a big net in the fashion of the "sigay" (fish trap/net). Hunting thus became much more uncomplicated. Because of the widespread use of the "sigay" both in the water and in the jungles, the lowland people who visited the place would eventually refer to it as Sigay.

The original settlers of Sigay were Igorots, or Pagans, who wandered from their ancestral lands in the Mountain Provinces north-westward to the Ilocos uplands. Many of them found a home in the mountains of Sigay. Years later, the natives' descendants made vows in marriage with pretty Ilocanas. Their offspring were born mestizos - fair skinned, red lipped, pink cheeked and brown haired - and became known as the "New Ilocanos". In the year 1700, when Christianity was introduced in the interior towns, baptized children were proclaimed as the "New Christians" or in Tagalog, the "BAGO". To this day, descendants of the Igorot natives, the Bago tribes continue to live in Sigay.

The Bago people are religious, thrifty, hospitable and cooperative. Although most of the area has been modernized, there are definite traces of the native customs and beliefs. For instance, to this day, the dance "Tadek" is performed during the wedding celebrations. In many sitios, the bayanihan spirit generally prevails, especially when building houses, or during the planting and harvest seasons. However, some of the older rituals like the Kanlaw are no longer performed, unless necessary.

To the Bagos of past years, the family was the basic unit of society, and the members were expected to work hand in hand to earn a living. The men, as head of the family, were usually the breadwinners. These days, however, owing perhaps to poverty, the wives are often seen helping their husbands earn money - whether in the farm, the forest, in the family business, or as government employees/workers, in order to make ends meet.

The people prefer a peaceful life to complexities; nonetheless they aspire for economic and infrastructure development in the municipality, especially the development of the main road that would connect them to the lowland urban centers, where they would sell their goods, and eventually be able to augment to the family income.

Many members of the Bago tribe from Sigay ventured into the municipality of Tabuk - the capital town of what was then the province of Kalinga-Apayao - in the 1940s well into the 1950s. There, they found settlements which were then exclusively made up of settlers with Sigay origin - the most notable of which is the barangay of Casigayan (with the Sigay still kept in the name), which literally means "a place of Sigay people."

Establishment of the Municipality
By the time the Spaniards arrived in the northern part of the country, all the interior towns of Ilocos Sur were part of Montanosa or the Mountain Provinces. A sub-province of Montanosa was that of Amburayan, a prominent area of trade and commerce, which among others, included the towns of Gregorio del Pilar, Quirino, Cervantes, Lidlidda and San Emilio. Called after the vast Amburayan River that cascaded through it, and nurtured its fields, Amburayan was a vast stronghold of the natives; the river itself, fed by the springs from the mountains in the East, was wide, and foreign vessels used to dock there to trade with the natives. When the Spanish founded Ciudad Fernandina (Vigan), all the interior towns, Sigay included, were cut off Montanosa, and these became part of the Province of Ilocos Sur. The original inhabitants were natives and had the same facial features as the Igorots.

Although already fully recognized by the Spanish Regime as a municipal district town in the 1800s, it was only in 1960 that Sigay emerged as a fully-fledged municipality, that which the residents called the New Era of Sigay. This came after the first elections of its local officials on November 12, 1959.

Today, Sigay is composed of seven barangays: Mabileg, Poblacion, San Ramon, San Elias, Abaccan, Matallucod, and Santo Rosario. For a long time, the seat of local government resided in Abaccan.  Later on, the local executive, Mayor Simeon Wandas (1960–1977) decided to build a Municipal Hall in Maday-aw (now, Poblacion) where, eventually, he transferred all the local government's occupations, including the Municipal Police Station.

Geography
Nestled near the Cordillera ranges, Sigay has crisp cool air and rustic scenery. Known to nature-lovers, adventurers, campers and mountaineers, the town attracts visitors with its version of the rice terraces, the  Aw-asen Falls, the kilometric hanging bridge, and its picturesque rivers.

Sigay is bordered on the north by the Municipality of Gregorio del Pilar, south by the Municipality of Suyo; east by the Municipality of Quirino, and west by the Municipality of Santa Cruz. Sigay can be reached one and a half hour ride from the City of Candon through strong-geared vehicles traversing 30 km, 22 km concrete and 8 km rugged roads, passing stony rivers crossing several times and going up through mountain terrains. During rainy season, the place is isolated by swollen rivers and muddy slippery roads. Residents adopt themselves by negotiating distances by hike.

The Municipality is nestled in a wide mountainous area where most of its forest is still untouched. Both ends of the Municipality is bounded with rivers namely Quinibor Rivers at the north, and Ida, Suyo Rivers in the south. Its type of soil is best suited to diversified crops.

The town has a total land area of 80.28 km2. comprising seven barangays. The place has a vast mountain ranges and forest wherein bountiful forest products abound.

Barangays
Sigay is politically subdivided into 7 barangays. These barangays are headed by elected officials: Barangay Captain, Barangay Council, whose members are called Barangay Councilors. All are elected every three years.

 Abaccan
 Mabileg
 Matallucod
 Poblacion (Madayaw)
 San Elias
 San Ramon
 Santo Rosario

Climate

The climate pattern of Sigay has two pronounced season, wet and dry season. The type of season is very common not only in the nearby towns but in the entire region as well. The wet or rainy season is from the months of June to October and dry season is from the months November to May. The place is cold throughout the year due to the altitude of the town. The coldest months are from November to February.

Demographics

In the 2020 census, Sigay had a population of 2,552.

The municipality's population started a total number of eleven inhabitants during the 1930 National Census of Population, and gradually increased to 1,036 in the following years of census (1908 census) with a highest geometric growth rate in its history at 33.26% per year. This end dates back to the time when the Bago tribes still growing, as describe in the municipal legend. During those times only mountain trails to trek on, and the residents have abundant virgin resources abound. Perhaps, the first sixteen (16) years of relatively rapid population increase is a classic example of what geographic information about the land, and demography, for that matter would certainly bring to an upland municipality.

Language
The language dialect used by the residents in the place is purely Ilocano, although many residents specially young can understand and speak English and Tagalog. The use of Filipino or Tagalog as a medium of instruction in the elementary school helps the children understand and speak the language.

Religion
There were many religious sects being practiced in this place. The Roman Catholic consists most in terms of the percentage of the population while the so-called Protestants were the United Church of Christ in the Philippines, The Way of Salvation, Seventh Day Adventist and the Assemblies of God and Jehovah's Witnesses.

Economy 

The town of Sigay is predominantly an agricultural municipality. Though the area is rugged and mountainous, it has a wide level areas suited for agriculture. Most of the resident engaged and raised crops like tobacco, coffee which is their main products and primary source of livelihood.

The place has no public market up to the present so the residents need to transport their farm products to the lowlands for proper disposal and convert it into cash to buy their some basic needs especially during rainy season.

Since most of the families, agriculture is their main source of income not only in this municipality. Indeed, the Department of Agriculture want to alleviate poverty, enhance income, profit and put into secured food sufficiency. To achieve these visions and aspirations, the department in consultation with our constituents at the grass roots level and other appropriate government agencies and offices, shall formulate and implement a medium and long term comprehensive Agriculture and Fishery Modernization Plan.

Government
Sigay, belonging to the second congressional district of the province of Ilocos Sur, is governed by a mayor designated as its local chief executive and by a municipal council as its legislative body in accordance with the Local Government Code. The mayor, vice mayor, and the councilors are elected directly by the people through an election which is being held every three years.

Elected officials

Education
The municipality have seven schools including the Secondary School. There are two primaries which were situated at Barangay Mabileg and Barangay Matallucod while there were four elementary schools. One is Sigay Central School situated at Barangay San Ramon. Another is Abaccan Elementary School and the other two were San Elias Elementary School and Santo Rosario Elementary School. The secondary school is located at Poblacion which is now on its 8th year of operation. Because education is very important, the local officials strive more to provide school facilities and other needs to improve the newly established secondary school other than providing facilities, there are also employed teachers shouldered by the local funds to hep the school to its successful and continues operation.

References

External links
Pasyalang Ilocos Sur
Philippine Standard Geographic Code
Philippine Census Information
Local Governance Performance Management System

Municipalities of Ilocos Sur